Cycas pectinata was the fourth species of Cycas to be named; it was described in 1826 by Scottish surgeon and botanist Francis Buchanan-Hamilton from Kamrup, Assam in northeast India. The species is one of the most widespread cycads. It is found in the northeastern part of India (Assam, Manipur, Meghalaya, Sikkim, Darjeeling), Nepal, Bhutan, northern Burma, southern China (Yunnan), Bangladesh, Burma, Malaysia, Cambodia, northern Thailand,  Laos, and Vietnam. Cycas pectinata usually grow at elevation 300 m to 1200 m and in difficult terrains. In China, it grows in dry, open thickets in limestone mountains, red soil in sparse monsoon forests. The tallest Cycas pectinata is a female plant in North Kamrup, Assam which measures . The tree is the world's tallest Cycas plant. In Northeast India, the species is under severe threat due to clearing of forest and overcollection of male cones for preparation of traditional medicines. The species is listed in CITES Appendix II and IUCN Redlist.

Historical information
Cycas pectinata was described by Hamilton in 1826 from “On the hills which bound Bengal to the east” with its habitat at “Camrupae sylvis”. Kamrup (Camrupae) is a district in Assam (Northeast India).

Morphology
Tall evergreen trees with crown of leaves at the apex of trunk. Stems robust, glabrous at base and usually branched when mature.  Leaves 1 to 2 m long, dark green. Male cones usually large, cylindrically ovoid and yellowish or orange in maturity. Megasporophylls deeply pectinate and densely covered with hairs. Seeds ovoid, glabrous and orange to red-yellow on maturity.

Uses

Economic
Cycas pectinata is popular ornamental plant grown in gardens and at public places. In Assam, green mature leaves are used to decorate large numbers of temporary shrines called “Pooja Pandals,” erected to worship deities during festivals. The leaves are used for decoration of the entrance of the marriage pandals and bouquets.

Traditional
Young fronds are eaten as vegetables in Manipur and Sikkim. Seeds of Cycas pectinata are traditionally utilized as a source of starch by indigenous tribes and are eaten raw or roasted in Assam and the bordering region of Meghalaya. Microsporophylls are chewed raw to cure stomach-aches and ulcers. The young microsporophylls are eaten by young men in Meghalaya and Assam to enhance male sexual potency

Vietnam 
In Vietnam, cycas pectinata are called Hundred Year tree (Cây thiên tuế) and are considered as auspicious ornamental plants. Large cycads are often placed in front of mansions and corporate or government offices.

Conservation efforts
[[Image:Cycas_pectinata_conservation.jpg|thumb|left|Cycad Conservation Program in Manipur, India]]
In Northeast India, two conservation program are going on for the conservation of Cycas pectinata populations in the state of Assam and Manipur. In 2014, 'Yendang: The Living Fossil', a cycad conservation program involving indigenous tribes and state forest department started in one of the cycad localities of Manipur (Yendang is local name of Cycas pectinata'' in Manipur).
From 2015 onwards, Cycadologists and cycad lovers are organising Cycad Volleyball Tournament in Manipur to create awareness among the locals and to encourage youths in safeguarding the cycad populations.

References

Pectinata
Flora of the Indian subcontinent
Flora of Indo-China
Flora of Yunnan
Plants described in 1826